John Betjeman: A Poet in London is a 1959 British short film about John Betjeman directed by Ken Russell for the Monitor series. It was his first professional film. Russell made a second film with Betjeman, Journey into a Lost World, first shown in 1960.

References

External links
A Poet in London at IMDb
A Poet in London at BFI

1959 in British television
British television films
British documentary films
Films directed by Ken Russell